The Tri-City Herald is a daily newspaper based in Kennewick, Washington, United States. Owned by The McClatchy Company, the newspaper serves southeastern Washington state, including the three cities of Kennewick, Pasco and Richland (which are collectively known as the Tri-Cities). The Herald also serves the smaller cities of Benton City, Connell, Prosser and West Richland. It is the only major English-language newspaper in Washington east of Yakima and south of Spokane, and includes local and national news, opinion columns, sports information, movie listings and comic strips among other features.

The paper was founded in 1918 as the weekly Pasco Herald.  In 1947, Glenn C. Lee and Robert Philip bought the paper, moved it to Kennewick and transformed it into the area's first daily paper, coining the name 'Tri-Cities' as part of the paper's name.  Lee and Philip sold the paper to McClatchy in 1979.  After over 30 years as an afternoon paper, it became a morning paper in 1984. It added a Saturday edition in 1987.

In 1950, striking workers of the Herald launched a morning competitor, Columbia Basin News, in Pasco. From 1950 until the summer of 1963, the Tri-Cities was one of the smallest U.S. markets with two competing daily newspapers. Columbia Basin News printed its last issue in 1963.

References

External links

Tri-City Herald official Web site
Tri-City Herald official mobile Web site
SportsTriCities.com, the Tri-City Herald's sports-only Web site
The McClatchy Company's subsidiary profile of the Tri-City Herald
Pasco Herald archive at Library of Congress

Newspapers published in Washington (state)
McClatchy publications
Tri-Cities, Washington